Marlon Brando Jr. (April 3, 1924 – July 1, 2004) was an American actor. Considered one of the most influential actors of the 20th century, he received numerous accolades throughout his career, which spanned six decades, including two Academy Awards, two Golden Globe Awards, one Cannes Film Festival Award and three British Academy Film Awards. Brando was also an activist for many causes, notably the civil rights movement and various Native American movements. Having studied with Stella Adler in the 1940s, he is credited with being one of the first actors to bring the Stanislavski system of acting, and method acting, to mainstream audiences.

Brando was raised in Omaha, Nebraska. In the 1940s, he moved to New York City and fell under the influence of Stella Adler and the Stanislavski system of acting. Despite a string of unimpressive performances on stage, he was adept at reading his characters, and consistently anticipated where scenes flowed. Brando initially gained acclaim and his first Academy Award nomination for Best Actor in a Leading Role for reprising the role of Stanley Kowalski in the 1951 film adaptation of Tennessee Williams' play A Streetcar Named Desire, a role that he originated successfully on Broadway. He received further praise, and a first Academy Award and Golden Globe Award, for his performance as Terry Malloy in On the Waterfront (1954). It remains a watershed moment in the history of Hollywood, and his work continues to be studied and interpreted. His portrayal of the rebellious motorcycle gang leader Johnny Strabler in The Wild One proved to be an emblem of the era's generational gap.

The 1960s saw Brando's career take a commercial and critical downturn. He directed and starred in the cult western One-Eyed Jacks, a commercial flop, after which he delivered a series of notable box-office failures, beginning with Mutiny on the Bounty (1962) which damaged his career. After ten years of underachieving and markedly diminished interest in his films, he agreed to do a screen test as Vito Corleone in Francis Ford Coppola's The Godfather (1972). He got the part and subsequently won his second Academy Award and Golden Globe Award in a performance considered among the finest in the art form's history, based on extensive surveys of critics, directors, and other actors. He declined the Academy Award due to "the treatment of American Indians today by the film industry ... and also with recent happenings at Wounded Knee", sending Sacheen Littlefeather to the televised ceremony to refuse the award and make a statement on his behalf. The Godfather became the highest-grossing film ever made, and alongside his Oscar-nominated performance in Last Tango in Paris (1972), Brando reestablished himself in the ranks of top box-office stars.

After a hiatus in the early 1970s, Brando was generally content with being a highly paid character actor in supporting roles of varying quality, such as Jor-El in Superman (1978), as Colonel Kurtz in Apocalypse Now (1979), and Adam Steiffel in The Formula (1980), before taking a nine-year break from film. According to the Guinness Book of World Records, Brando was paid a record $3.7 million ($ million in inflation-adjusted dollars) and 11.75% of the gross profits for 13 days' work on Superman. The 1990s and the 2000s were marked with controversy for Brando, and his troubled private life received much attention. He struggled with mood disorders and legal issues. Brando continues to be held in high regard; he was one of only six actors named in 1999 by Time magazine in its list of the 100 Most Important People of the Century. In this list, Time also designated Brando as the "Actor of the Century".

Early life and education 
Brando was born in Omaha, Nebraska, on April 3, 1924, to Marlon Brando Sr. (1895–1965), a pesticide and chemical feed manufacturer, and Dorothy Julia Pennebaker (1897–1954). Brando had two elder sisters, named Jocelyn (1919–2005) and Frances (1922–1994). His ancestry was mostly German, Dutch, English, and Irish. His patrilineal immigrant ancestor, Johann Wilhelm Brandau, arrived in New York City in the early 1700s from the Palatinate in Germany. He is also a descendant of Louis DuBois, a French Huguenot, who arrived in New York around 1660. His maternal great-grandfather, Myles Joseph Gahan, was an Irish immigrant who served as a medic in the American Civil War. In 1995, he gave an interview in Ireland in which he said, "I have never been so happy in my life. When I got off the plane I had this rush of emotion. I have never felt at home in a place as I do here. I am seriously contemplating Irish citizenship." Brando was raised a Christian Scientist.

His mother, known as Dodie, was unconventional for her time; she smoked, wore pants, and drove cars. An actress herself and a theater administrator, she helped Henry Fonda begin his acting career. However, she was an alcoholic and often had to be brought home from bars in Chicago by her husband. In his autobiography, Songs My Mother Taught Me, Brando expressed sadness when writing about his mother: "The anguish that her drinking produced was that she preferred getting drunk to caring for us." Dodie and Brando's father eventually joined Alcoholics Anonymous. Brando harbored far more enmity for his father, stating, "I was his namesake, but nothing I did ever pleased or even interested him. He enjoyed telling me I couldn't do anything right. He had a habit of telling me I would never amount to anything." When he was four, Brando was sexually abused by his teenage governess. Brando became attached to her, and was distraught when she left him. For the rest of his life, Brando was distraught over her loss. Around 1930, Brando's parents moved to Evanston, Illinois, when his father's work took him to Chicago, but separated in 1935 when Brando was 11 years old. His mother took the three children to Santa Ana, California, where they lived with her mother. Brando's parents reconciled by 1937, and by the next year left Evanston and moved together to a farm in Libertyville, Illinois, a small town north of Chicago. Between 1939 and 1941, he worked as an usher at the town's only movie theater, The Liberty.

Brando, whose childhood nickname was "Bud", was a mimic from his youth. He developed an ability to absorb the mannerisms of children he played with and display them dramatically while staying in character. He was introduced to neighborhood boy Wally Cox and the two were closest friends until Cox's death in 1973. In the 2007 TCM biopic Brando: The Documentary, childhood friend George Englund recalls Brando's earliest acting as imitating the cows and horses on the family farm as a way to distract his mother from drinking. His sister Jocelyn was the first to pursue an acting career, going to study at the American Academy of Dramatic Arts in New York City. She appeared on Broadway, then films and television. Brando's sister Frances left college in California to study art in New York. Brando had been held back a year in school and was later expelled from Libertyville High School for riding his motorcycle through the corridors.

He was sent to Shattuck Military Academy in Minnesota, where his father had studied before him. Brando excelled at theater and did well in the school. In his final year (1943), he was put on probation for being insubordinate to a visiting army colonel during maneuvers. He was confined to his room, but sneaked into town and was caught. The faculty voted to expel him, though he was supported by the students, who thought expulsion was too harsh. He was invited back for the following year, but decided instead to drop out of high school. Brando worked as a ditch-digger as a summer job arranged by his father. He tried to enlist in the Army, but his induction physical revealed that a football injury he had sustained at Shattuck had left him with a trick knee. He was classified IV-F (physically unfit for military service) and not inducted.

New York and acting
Brando decided to follow his sisters to New York, studying at the American Theatre Wing Professional School, part of the Dramatic Workshop of the New School, with influential German director Erwin Piscator. In a 1988 documentary, Marlon Brando: The Wild One, Brando's sister Jocelyn remembered, "He was in a school play and enjoyed it ... So he decided he would go to New York and study acting because that was the only thing he had enjoyed. That was when he was 18." In the A&E Biography episode on Brando, George Englund said Brando fell into acting in New York because "he was accepted there. He wasn't criticized. It was the first time in his life that he heard good things about himself." He spent his first few months in New York sleeping on friends' couches. For a time he lived with Roy Somlyo, who later became a four time Emmy winning Broadway producer.

Brando was an avid student and proponent of Stella Adler, from whom he learned the techniques of the Stanislavski system. This technique encouraged the actor to explore both internal and external aspects to fully realize the character being portrayed. Brando's remarkable insight and sense of realism were evident early on. Adler used to recount that when teaching Brando, she had instructed the class to act like chickens, and added that a nuclear bomb was about to fall on them. Most of the class clucked and ran around wildly, but Brando sat calmly and pretended to lay an egg. Asked by Adler why he had chosen to react this way, he said, "I'm a chicken—what do I know about bombs?" Despite being commonly regarded as a method actor, Brando disagreed. He claimed to have abhorred Lee Strasberg's teachings:

Brando was the first to bring a natural approach to acting on film. According to Dustin Hoffman in his online Masterclass, Brando would often talk to camera men and fellow actors about their weekend even after the director would call action. Once Brando felt he could deliver the dialogue as natural as that conversation he would start the dialogue. In his 2015 documentary, Listen To Me Marlon, he said before that actors were like breakfast cereals, meaning they were predictable. Critics would later say this was Brando being difficult, but actors who worked opposite would say it was just all part of his technique.

Career

Early career: 1944–1951
Brando used his Stanislavski System skills for his first summer stock roles in Sayville, New York, on Long Island. Brando established a pattern of erratic, insubordinate behavior in the few shows he had been in. His behavior had him kicked out of the cast of the New School's production in Sayville, but he was soon afterwards discovered in a locally produced play there. Then, in 1944, he made it to Broadway in the bittersweet drama I Remember Mama, playing the son of Mady Christians. The Lunts wanted Brando to play the role of Alfred Lunt's son in O Mistress Mine, and Lunt even coached him for the audition, but Brando made no attempt to even read his lines at the audition and was not hired. New York Drama Critics voted him "Most Promising Young Actor" for his role as an anguished veteran in Truckline Café, although the play was a commercial failure. In 1946, he appeared on Broadway as the young hero in the political drama A Flag is Born, refusing to accept wages above the Actors' Equity rate. In that same year, Brando played the role of Marchbanks alongside Katharine Cornell in her production's revival of Candida, one of her signature roles. Cornell also cast him as the Messenger in her production of Jean Anouilh's Antigone that same year. He was also offered the opportunity to portray one of the principal characters in the Broadway premiere of Eugene O'Neill's The Iceman Cometh, but turned the part down after falling asleep while trying to read the massive script and pronouncing the play "ineptly written and poorly constructed".

In 1945, Brando's agent recommended he take a co-starring role in The Eagle Has Two Heads with Tallulah Bankhead, produced by Jack Wilson. Bankhead had turned down the role of Blanche Dubois in A Streetcar Named Desire, which Williams had written for her, to tour the play for the 1946–1947 season. Bankhead recognized Brando's potential, despite her disdain (which most Broadway veterans shared) for method acting, and agreed to hire him even though he auditioned poorly. The two clashed greatly during the pre-Broadway tour, with Bankhead reminding Brando of his mother, being her age and also having a drinking problem. Wilson was largely tolerant of Brando's behavior, but he reached his limit when Brando mumbled through a dress rehearsal shortly before the November 28, 1946, opening. "I don't care what your grandmother did," Wilson exclaimed, "and that Method stuff, I want to know what you're going to do!" Brando in turn raised his voice, and acted with great power and passion. "It was marvelous," a cast member recalled. "Everybody hugged him and kissed him. He came ambling offstage and said to me, 'They don't think you can act unless you can yell.'"

Critics were not as kind, however. A review of Brando's performance in the opening assessed that Brando was "still building his character, but at present fails to impress." One Boston critic remarked of Brando's prolonged death scene, "Brando looked like a car in midtown Manhattan searching for a parking space." He received better reviews at subsequent tour stops, but what his colleagues recalled was only occasional indications of the talent he would later demonstrate. "There were a few times when he was really magnificent," Bankhead admitted to an interviewer in 1962. "He was a great young actor when he wanted to be, but most of the time I couldn't even hear him on the stage."

Brando displayed his apathy for the production by demonstrating some shocking onstage manners. He "tried everything in the world to ruin it for her," Bankhead's stage manager claimed. "He nearly drove her crazy: scratching his crotch, picking his nose, doing anything." After several weeks on the road, they reached Boston, by which time Bankhead was ready to dismiss him. This proved to be one of the greatest blessings of his career, as it freed him up to play the role of Stanley Kowalski in Tennessee Williams's 1947 play A Streetcar Named Desire, directed by Elia Kazan. Moreover, to that end, Bankhead herself, in her letter declining Williams' invitation to play the role of Blanche, gave Brando this ringing—albeit acid-tongued—endorsement:
I do have one suggestion for casting. I know of an actor who can appear as this brutish Stanley Kowalski character. I mean, a total pig of a man without sensitivity or grace of any kind. Marlon Brando would be perfect as Stanley. I have just fired the cad from my play, The Eagle Has Two Heads, and I know for a fact that he is looking for work.

Pierpont writes that John Garfield was first choice for the role, but "made impossible demands." It was Kazan's decision to fall back on the far less experienced (and technically too young for the role) Brando. In a letter dated August 29, 1947, Williams confided to his agent Audrey Wood: "It had not occurred to me before what an excellent value would come through casting a very young actor in this part. It humanizes the character of Stanley in that it becomes the brutality and callousness of youth rather than a vicious old man ... A new value came out of Brando's reading which was by far the best reading I have ever heard." Brando based his portrayal of Kowalski on the boxer Rocky Graziano, whom he had studied at a local gymnasium. Graziano did not know who Brando was, but attended the production with tickets provided by the young man. He said, "The curtain went up and on the stage is that son of a bitch from the gym, and he's playing me."

In 1947, Brando performed a screen test for an early Warner Brothers script for the novel Rebel Without a Cause (1944), which bore no relation to the film eventually produced in 1955. The screen test is included as an extra in the 2006 DVD release of A Streetcar Named Desire.

Brando's first screen role was a bitter paraplegic veteran in The Men (1950). He spent a month in bed at the Birmingham Army Hospital in Van Nuys to prepare for the role. The New York Times reviewer Bosley Crowther wrote that Brando as Ken "is so vividly real, dynamic and sensitive that his illusion is complete" and noted, "Out of stiff and frozen silences he can lash into a passionate rage with the tearful and flailing frenzy of a taut cable suddenly cut."

By Brando's own account, it may have been because of this film that his draft status was changed from 4-F to 1-A. He had had surgery on his trick knee, and it was no longer physically debilitating enough to incur exclusion from the draft. When Brando reported to the induction center, he answered a questionnaire by saying his race was "human", his color was "Seasonal-oyster white to beige", and he told an Army doctor that he was psychoneurotic. When the draft board referred him to a psychiatrist, Brando explained that he had been expelled from military school and had severe problems with authority. Coincidentally, the psychiatrist knew a doctor friend of Brando. Brando avoided military service during the Korean War.

Early in his career, Brando began using cue cards instead of memorizing his lines. Despite the objections of several of the film directors he worked with, Brando felt that this helped bring realism and spontaneity to his performances. He felt otherwise he would appear to be reciting a writer's speech. In the TV documentary The Making of Superman: The Movie, Brando explained:

Some, however, thought Brando used the cards out of laziness or an inability to memorize his lines. Once on The Godfather set, Brando was asked why he wanted his lines printed out. He responded, "Because I can read them that way."

Rise to fame: 1951–1954
Brando brought his performance as Stanley Kowalski to the screen in Tennessee William's A Streetcar Named Desire (1951). The role is regarded as one of Brando's greatest. It earned him his first Academy Award nomination in the Best Actor category.

He was also nominated the next year for Viva Zapata! (1952), a fictionalized account of the life of Mexican revolutionary Emiliano Zapata. The film recounted Zapata's lower-class upbringing, his rise to power in the early 20th century, and death. The film was directed by Elia Kazan and co-starred Anthony Quinn. In the biopic Marlon Brando: The Wild One, Sam Shaw says, "Secretly, before the picture started, he went to Mexico to the very town where Zapata lived and was born in and it was there that he studied the speech patterns of people, their behavior, movement." Most critics focused on the actor rather than the film, with Time and Newsweek publishing rave reviews.

Years later, in his autobiography, Brando remarked: "Tony Quinn, whom I admired professionally and liked personally, played my brother, but he was extremely cold to me while we shot that picture. During our scenes together, I sensed a bitterness toward me, and if I suggested a drink after work, he either turned me down or else was sullen and said little. Only years later did I learn why." Brando explained that, to create on-screen tension between the two, "Gadg" (Kazan) had told Quinn—who had taken over the role of Stanley Kowalski on Broadway after Brando had finished—that Brando had been unimpressed with his work. After achieving the desired effect, Kazan never told Quinn that he had misled him. It was only many years later, after comparing notes, that Brando and Quinn realized the deception.

Brando's next film, Julius Caesar (1953), received highly favorable reviews. Brando portrayed Mark Antony. While most acknowledged Brando's talent, some critics felt Brando's "mumbling" and other idiosyncrasies betrayed a lack of acting fundamentals and, when his casting was announced, many remained dubious about his prospects for success. Directed by Joseph L. Mankiewicz and co-starring British stage actor John Gielgud, Brando delivered an impressive performance, especially during Antony's noted "Friends, Romans, countrymen ..." speech. Gielgud was so impressed that he offered Brando a full season at the Hammersmith Theatre, an offer he declined. In his biography on the actor, Stefan Kanfer writes, "Marlon's autobiography devotes one line to his work on that film: Among all those British professionals, 'for me to walk onto a movie set and play Mark Anthony was asinine'—yet another example of his persistent self-denigration, and wholly incorrect." Kanfer adds that after a screening of the film, director John Huston commented, "Christ! It was like a furnace door opening—the heat came off the screen. I don't know another actor who could do that." During the filming of Julius Caesar, Brando learned that Elia Kazan had cooperated with congressional investigators, naming a whole string of "subversives" to the House Committee on Un-American Activities (HUAC). By all accounts, Brando was upset by his mentor's decision, but he worked with him again in On The Waterfront. "None of us is perfect," he later wrote in his memoir, "and I think that Gadg has done injury to others, but mostly to himself."

In 1953, Brando also starred in The Wild One, riding his own Triumph Thunderbird 6T motorcycle. Triumph's importers were ambivalent at the exposure, as the subject matter was rowdy motorcycle gangs taking over a small town. The film was criticized for its perceived gratuitous violence at the time, with Time stating, "The effect of the movie is not to throw light on the public problem, but to shoot adrenaline through the moviegoer's veins." Brando allegedly did not see eye to eye with the Hungarian director László Benedek and did not get on with costar Lee Marvin.

To Brando's expressed puzzlement, the movie inspired teen rebellion and made him a role model to the nascent rock-and-roll generation and future stars such as James Dean and Elvis Presley. After the movie's release, the sales of leather jackets and motorcycles skyrocketed. Reflecting on the movie in his autobiography, Brando concluded that it had not aged very well but said:

Later that same year, Brando co-starred with fellow Studio member William Redfield in a summer stock production of George Bernard Shaw's Arms and the Man.

On the Waterfront
In 1954, Brando starred in On the Waterfront, a crime drama film about union violence and corruption among longshoremen. The film was directed by Elia Kazan and written by Budd Schulberg; it also starred Karl Malden, Lee J. Cobb, Rod Steiger and, in her film debut, Eva Marie Saint. When initially offered the role, Brando—still stung by Kazan's testimony to HUAC—demurred and the part of Terry Malloy nearly went to Frank Sinatra. According to biographer Stefan Kanfer, the director believed that Sinatra, who grew up in Hoboken (where the film takes place and was shot), would work as Malloy, but eventually producer Sam Spiegel wooed Brando to the part, signing him for $100,000. "Kazan made no protest because, he subsequently confessed, 'I always preferred Brando to anybody.'"

Brando won the Oscar for his role as Irish-American stevedore Terry Malloy in On the Waterfront. His performance, spurred on by his rapport with Eva Marie Saint and Kazan's direction, was praised as a tour de force. For the scene in which Terry laments his failings, saying I coulda been a contender, he convinced Kazan that the scripted scene was unrealistic. Schulberg's script had Brando acting the entire scene with his character being held at gunpoint by his brother Charlie, played by Rod Steiger. Brando insisted on gently pushing away the gun, saying that Terry would never believe that his brother would pull the trigger and doubting that he could continue his speech while fearing a gun on him. Kazan let Brando improvise and later expressed deep admiration for Brando's instinctive understanding, saying:

Upon its release, On the Waterfront received glowing reviews from critics and was a commercial success, earning an estimated $4.2 million in rentals at the North American box office in 1954. In his July 29, 1954, review, The New York Times critic A. H. Weiler praised the film, calling it "an uncommonly powerful, exciting, and imaginative use of the screen by gifted professionals." Film critic Roger Ebert lauded the film, stating that Brando and Kazan changed acting in American films forever and added it to his "Great Movies" list. In his autobiography, Brando was typically dismissive of his performance: "On the day Gadg showed me the complete picture, I was so depressed by my performance I got up and left the screening room ... I thought I was a huge failure." After Brando won the Academy Award for Best Actor, the statue was stolen. Much later, it turned up at a London auction house, which contacted the actor and informed him of its whereabouts.

Box office successes and directorial debut: 1954–1959
Following On the Waterfront, Brando remained a top box office draw, but critics increasingly felt his performances were half-hearted, lacking the intensity and commitment found in his earlier work, especially in his work with Kazan. He portrayed Napoleon in the 1954 film Désirée. According to co-star Jean Simmons, Brando's contract forced him to star in the movie. He put little effort into the role, claiming he didn't like the script, and later dismissed the entire movie as "superficial and dismal". Brando was especially contemptuous of director Henry Koster.

Brando and Simmons were paired together again in the film adaptation of the musical Guys and Dolls (1955). Guys and Dolls would be Brando's first and last musical role. Time found the picture "false to the original in its feeling", remarking that Brando "sings in a faraway tenor that sometimes tends to be flat." Appearing in Edward Murrow's Person to Person interview in early 1955, he admitted to having problems with his singing voice, which he called "pretty terrible." In the 1965 documentary Meet Marlon Brando, he revealed that the final product heard in the movie was a result of countless singing takes being cut into one and later joked, "I couldn't hit a note with a baseball bat; some notes I missed by extraordinary margins ... They sewed my words together on one song so tightly that when I mouthed it in front of the camera, I nearly asphyxiated myself". Relations between Brando and costar Frank Sinatra were also frosty, with Stefan Kanfer observing: "The two men were diametrical opposites: Marlon required multiple takes; Frank detested repeating himself." Upon their first meeting Sinatra reportedly scoffed, "Don't give me any of that Actors Studio shit." Brando later quipped, "Frank is the kind of guy, when he dies, he's going to heaven and give God a hard time for making him bald." Frank Sinatra called Brando "the world's most overrated actor", and referred to him as "mumbles". The film was commercially though not critically successful, costing $5.5 million to make and grossing $13 million.

Brando played Sakini, a Japanese interpreter for the U.S. Army in postwar Japan, in The Teahouse of the August Moon (1956). Pauline Kael was not particularly impressed by the movie, but noted "Marlon Brando starved himself to play the pixie interpreter Sakini, and he looks as if he's enjoying the stunt—talking with a mad accent, grinning boyishly, bending forward, and doing tricky movements with his legs. He's harmlessly genial (and he is certainly missed when he's offscreen), though the fey, roguish role doesn't allow him to do what he's great at and it's possible that he's less effective in it than a lesser actor might have been." In Sayonara (1957) he appeared as a United States Air Force officer. Newsweek found the film a "dull tale of the meeting of the twain", but it was nevertheless a box-office success. According to Stefan Kanfer's biography of the actor, Brando's manager Jay Kanter negotiated a profitable contract with ten percent of the gross going to Brando, which put him in the millionaire category. The movie was controversial due to openly discussing interracial marriage, but proved a great success, earning 10 Academy Award nominations, with Brando being nominated for Best Actor. The film went on to win four Academy Awards. Teahouse and Sayonara were the first in a string of films Brando would strive to make over the next decade which contained socially relevant messages, and he formed a partnership with Paramount to establish his own production company called Pennebaker, its declared purpose to develop films that contained "social value that would improve the world." The name was a tribute in honor of his mother, who had died in 1954. By all accounts, Brando was devastated by her death, with biographer Peter Manso telling A&E's Biography, "She was the one who could give him approval like no one else could and, after his mother died, it seems that Marlon stops caring." Brando appointed his father to run Pennebaker. In the same A&E special, George Englund claims that Brando gave his father the job because "it gave Marlon a chance to take shots at him, to demean and diminish him".

In 1958, Brando appeared in The Young Lions, dyeing his hair blonde and assuming a German accent for the role, which he later admitted was not convincing. The film is based on the novel by Irwin Shaw, and Brando's portrayal of the character Christian Diestl was controversial for its time. He later wrote, "The original script closely followed the book, in which Shaw painted all Germans as evil caricatures, especially Christian, whom he portrayed as a symbol of everything that was bad about Nazism; he was mean, nasty, vicious, a cliché of evil ... I thought the story should demonstrate that there are no inherently 'bad' people in the world, but they can easily be misled." Shaw and Brando even appeared together for a televised interview with CBS correspondent David Schoenbrun and, during a bombastic exchange, Shaw charged that, like most actors, Brando was incapable of playing flat-out villainy; Brando responded by stating "Nobody creates a character but an actor. I play the role; now he exists. He is my creation." The Young Lions also features Brando's only appearance in a film with friend and rival Montgomery Clift (although they shared no scenes together). Brando closed out the decade by appearing in The Fugitive Kind (1960) opposite Anna Magnani. The film was based on another play by Tennessee Williams but was hardly the success A Streetcar Named Desire had been, with the Los Angeles Times labeling Williams's personae "psychologically sick or just plain ugly" and The New Yorker calling it a "cornpone melodrama".

One-Eyed Jacks and Mutiny on the Bounty

In 1961, Brando made his directorial debut in the western One-Eyed Jacks. The picture was originally directed by Stanley Kubrick, but he was fired early in the production. Paramount then made Brando the director. Brando portrays the lead character Rio, and Karl Malden plays his partner "Dad" Longworth. The supporting cast features Katy Jurado, Ben Johnson, and Slim Pickens. Brando's penchant for multiple retakes and character exploration as an actor carried over into his directing, however, and the film soon went over budget; Paramount expected the film to take three months to complete but shooting stretched to six and the cost doubled to more than six million dollars. Brando's inexperience as an editor also delayed postproduction and Paramount eventually took control of the film. Brando later wrote, "Paramount said it didn't like my version of the story; I'd had everyone lie except Karl Malden. The studio cut the movie to pieces and made him a liar, too. By then, I was bored with the whole project and walked away from it". One-Eyed Jacks was received with mixed reviews by critics.

Brando's revulsion with the film industry reportedly boiled over on the set of his next film, Metro-Goldwyn-Mayer's remake of Mutiny on the Bounty, which was filmed in Tahiti. The actor was accused of deliberately sabotaging nearly every aspect of the production. On June 16, 1962, The Saturday Evening Post ran an article by Bill Davidson with the headline "Six million dollars down the drain: the mutiny of Marlon Brando". Mutiny director Lewis Milestone claimed that the executives "deserve what they get when they give a ham actor, a petulant child, complete control over an expensive picture."  Mutiny on the Bounty nearly capsized MGM and, while the project had indeed been hampered with delays other than Brando's behavior, the accusations would dog the actor for years as studios began to fear Brando's difficult reputation. Critics also began taking note of his fluctuating weight.

Box office decline: 1963–1971
Distracted by his personal life and becoming disillusioned with his career, Brando began to view acting as a means to a financial end. Critics protested when he started accepting roles in films many perceived as being beneath his talent, or criticized him for failing to live up to the better roles. Previously only signing short-term deals with film studios, in 1961 Brando uncharacteristically signed a five-picture deal with Universal Studios that would haunt him for the rest of the decade. The Ugly American (1963) was the first of these films. Based on the 1958 novel of the same title that Pennebaker had optioned, the film, which featured Brando's sister Jocelyn, was rated fairly positively but died at the box office. Brando was nominated for a Golden Globe for his performance. All of Brando's other Universal films during this period, including Bedtime Story (1964), The Appaloosa (1966), A Countess from Hong Kong (1967) and The Night of the Following Day (1969), were also critical and commercial flops. Countess in particular was a disappointment for Brando, who had looked forward to working with one of his heroes, director Charlie Chaplin. The experience turned out to be an unhappy one; Brando was horrified at Chaplin's didactic style of direction and his authoritarian approach. Brando had also appeared in the spy thriller Morituri in 1965; that, too, failed to attract an audience.

Brando acknowledged his professional decline, writing later, "Some of the films I made during the sixties were successful; some weren't. Some, like The Night of the Following Day, I made only for the money; others, like Candy, I did because a friend asked me to and I didn't want to turn him down ... In some ways I think of my middle age as the Fuck You Years." Candy was especially appalling for many; a 1968 sex farce film directed by Christian Marquand and based on the 1958 novel by Terry Southern, the film satirizes pornographic stories through the adventures of its naive heroine, Candy, played by Ewa Aulin. It is generally regarded as the nadir of Brando's career. The Washington Post observed: "Brando's self-indulgence over a dozen years is costing him and his public his talents." In the March 1966 issue of The Atlantic, Pauline Kael wrote that in his rebellious days, Brando "was antisocial because he knew society was crap; he was a hero to youth because he was strong enough not to take the crap", but now Brando and others like him had become "buffoons, shamelessly, pathetically mocking their public reputations." In an earlier review of The Appaloosa in 1966, Kael wrote that the actor was "trapped in another dog of a movie ... Not for the first time, Mr. Brando gives us a heavy-lidded, adenoidally openmouthed caricature of the inarticulate, stalwart loner." Although he feigned indifference, Brando was hurt by the critical mauling, admitting in the 2015 film Listen to Me Marlon, "They can hit you every day and you have no way of fighting back. I was very convincing in my pose of indifference, but I was very sensitive and it hurt a lot."

Brando portrayed a repressed gay army officer in Reflections in a Golden Eye, directed by John Huston and co-starring Elizabeth Taylor. The role turned out as one of his most acclaimed in years, with Stanley Crouch marveling, "Brando's main achievement was to portray the taciturn but stoic gloom of those pulverized by circumstances." The film overall received mixed reviews. Another notable film was The Chase (1966), which paired the actor with director Arthur Penn, Jane Fonda, Robert Redford and Robert Duvall. The film deals with themes of racism, sexual revolution, small-town corruption, and vigilantism. The film was received mostly positively.

Brando cited Burn! (1969) as his personal favorite of the films he had made, writing in his autobiography, "I think I did some of the best acting I've ever done in that picture, but few people came to see it." Brando dedicated a full chapter to the film in his memoir, stating that the director, Gillo Pontecorvo, was the best director he had ever worked with next to Kazan and Bernardo Bertolucci. Brando also detailed his clashes with Pontecorvo on the set and how "we nearly killed each other." Loosely based on events in the history of Guadeloupe, the film got a hostile reception from critics. In 1971, Michael Winner directed him in the British horror film The Nightcomers with Stephanie Beacham, Thora Hird, Harry Andrews and Anna Palk. It is a prequel to The Turn of the Screw, which had previously been filmed as  The Innocents (1961). Brando's performance earned him a nomination for a Best Actor BAFTA, but the film bombed at the box office.

The Godfather and Last Tango in Paris
During the 1970s, Brando was considered "unbankable". Critics were becoming increasingly dismissive of his work and he had not appeared in a box office hit since The Young Lions in 1958, the last year he had ranked as one of the Top Ten Box Office Stars and the year of his last Academy Award nomination, for Sayonara. Brando's performance as Vito Corleone, the "Don," in The Godfather (1972), Francis Ford Coppola's adaptation of Mario Puzo's 1969 bestselling novel of the same name, was a career turning point, putting him back in the Top Ten and winning him his second Best Actor Oscar.

Paramount production chief Robert Evans, who had given Puzo an advance to write The Godfather so that Paramount would own the film rights, hired Coppola after many major directors had turned the film down. Evans wanted an Italian-American director who could provide the film with cultural authenticity. Coppola also came cheap. Evans was conscious of the fact that Paramount's last Mafia film, The Brotherhood (1968) had been a box office bomb, and he believed it was partly due to the fact that the director, Martin Ritt, and the star, Kirk Douglas, were Jewish, and the film lacked an authentic Italian flavor. The studio originally intended the film to be a low-budget production set in contemporary times without any major actors, but the phenomenal success of the novel gave Evans the clout to turn The Godfather into a prestige picture.

Coppola had developed a list of actors for all the roles, and his list of potential Dons included the Oscar-winning Italian-American Ernest Borgnine, the Italian-American Frank de Kova (best known for playing Chief Wild Eagle on the TV sitcom F-Troop), John Marley (a Best Supporting Oscar-nominee for Paramount's 1970 hit film Love Story who was cast as the film producer Jack Woltz in the picture), the Italian-American Richard Conte (who was cast as Don Corleone's deadly rival Don Emilio Barzini), and Italian film producer Carlo Ponti. Coppola admitted in a 1975 interview, "We finally figured we had to lure the best actor in the world. It was that simple. That boiled down to Laurence Olivier or Marlon Brando, who are the greatest actors in the world." The holographic copy of Coppola's cast list shows Brando's name underlined.

Evans told Coppola that he had been thinking of Brando for the part two years earlier, and Puzo had imagined Brando in the part when he wrote the novel and had actually written to him about the part, so Coppola and Evans narrowed it down to Brando. (Ironically, Olivier would compete with Brando for the Best Actor Oscar for his part in Sleuth. He bested Brando at the 1972 New York Film Critics Circle Awards.) Albert S. Ruddy, whom Paramount assigned to produce the film, agreed with the choice of Brando. However, Paramount studio executives were opposed to casting Brando due to his reputation for difficulty and his long string of box office flops. Brando also had One-Eyed Jacks working against him, a troubled production that lost money for Paramount when it was released in 1961. Paramount Pictures President Stanley Jaffe told an exasperated Coppola, "As long as I'm president of this studio, Marlon Brando will not be in this picture, and I will no longer allow you to discuss it."

Jaffe eventually set three conditions for the casting of Brando: That he would have to take a fee far below what he typically received; he'd have to agree to accept financial responsibility for any production delays his behavior cost; and he had to submit to a screen test. Coppola convinced Brando to do a videotaped "make-up" test, in which Brando did his own makeup (he used cotton balls to simulate the character's puffed cheeks). Coppola had feared Brando might be too young to play the Don, but was electrified by the actor's characterization as the head of a crime family. Even so, he had to fight the studio in order to cast the temperamental actor. Brando had doubts himself, stating in his autobiography, "I had never played an Italian before, and I didn't think I could do it successfully." Eventually, Charles Bluhdorn, the president of Paramount parent Gulf+Western, was won over to letting Brando have the role; when he saw the screen test, he asked in amazement, "What are we watching? Who is this old guinea?" Brando was signed for a low fee of $50,000, but in his contract, he was given a percentage of the gross on a sliding scale: 1% of the gross for each $10 million over a $10 million threshold, up to 5% if the picture exceeded $60 million. According to Evans, Brando sold back his points in the picture for $100,000, as he was in dire need of funds. "That $100,000 cost him $11 million," Evans claimed.

In a 1994 interview that can be found on the Academy of Achievement website, Coppola insisted, "The Godfather was a very unappreciated movie when we were making it. They were very unhappy with it. They didn't like the cast. They didn't like the way I was shooting it. I was always on the verge of getting fired." When word of this reached Brando, he threatened to walk off the picture, writing in his memoir, "I strongly believe that directors are entitled to independence and freedom to realize their vision, though Francis left the characterizations in our hands and we had to figure out what to do." In a 2010 television interview with Larry King, Al Pacino also talked about how Brando's support helped him keep the role of Michael Corleone in the movie—despite the fact Coppola wanted to fire him. Pacino also explained in the Larry King interview that, while Coppola expressed disappointment in Pacino's early scenes, he did not specifically threaten to fire him; Coppola himself was feeling pressure from studio executives who were puzzled by Pacino's performance. In the same interview, Pacino credits Coppola with getting him the part. Brando was on his best behavior during filming, buoyed by a cast that included Pacino, Robert Duvall, James Caan, and Diane Keaton. In the Vanity Fair article "The Godfather Wars", Mark Seal writes, "With the actors, as in the movie, Brando served as the head of the family. He broke the ice by toasting the group with a glass of wine." 'When we were young, Brando was like the godfather of actors,' says Robert Duvall. 'I used to meet with Dustin Hoffman in Cromwell's Drugstore, and if we mentioned his name once, we mentioned it 25 times in a day.' Caan adds, 'The first day we met Brando everybody was in awe.'"

Brando's performance was glowingly reviewed by critics. "I thought it would be interesting to play a gangster, maybe for the first time in the movies, who wasn't like those bad guys Edward G. Robinson played, but who is kind of a hero, a man to be respected," Brando recalled in his autobiography. "Also, because he had so much power and unquestioned authority, I thought it would be an interesting contrast to play him as a gentle man, unlike Al Capone, who beat up people with baseball bats." Duvall later marveled to A&E's Biography, "He minimized the sense of beginning. In other words he, like, deemphasized the word action. He would go in front of that camera just like he was before. Cut! It was all the same. There was really no beginning. I learned a lot from watching that." Brando won the Academy Award for Best Actor for his performance, but he declined it, becoming the second actor to refuse a Best Actor award (after George C. Scott for Patton). Brando did not attend the award ceremony; instead, he sent actress Sacheen Littlefeather (who appeared in Plains Indian-style regalia) to decline the Oscar on his behalf. After refusing to touch the statue at the podium, she announced to the crowd that Brando was rejecting the award in protest of "the treatment of American Indians today by the film industry … and on television and movie reruns and also with recent happenings at Wounded Knee." The Wounded Knee Occupation of 1973 was occurring at the time of the ceremony. Brando had written a longer speech for her to read but, as she explained, this was not permitted due to time constraints. In the written speech Brando added that he hoped his declining the Oscar would be seen as "an earnest effort to focus attention on an issue that might very well determine whether or not this country has the right to say from this point forward we believe in the inalienable rights of all people to remain free and independent on lands that have supported their life beyond living memory."

The actor followed The Godfather with Bernardo Bertolucci's 1972 film Last Tango in Paris, playing opposite Maria Schneider, but Brando's highly noted performance threatened to be overshadowed by an uproar over the sexual content of the film. Brando portrays a recent American widower named Paul, who begins an anonymous sexual relationship with a young, betrothed Parisian woman named Jeanne. As with previous films, Brando refused to memorize his lines for many scenes; instead, he wrote his lines on cue cards and posted them around the set for easy reference, leaving Bertolucci with the problem of keeping them out of the picture frame. The film features several intense, graphic scenes involving Brando, including Paul anally raping Jeanne using butter as a lubricant, which it was alleged was not consensual. The actress confirmed that no actual sex occurred, but she complained that she was not told what the scene would include until shortly prior to filming.

Bertolucci also shot a scene which showed Brando's genitals, but in 1973 explained, "I had so identified myself with Brando that I cut it out of shame for myself. To show him naked would have been like showing me naked." Schneider declared in an interview that "Marlon said he felt raped and manipulated by it and he was 48. And he was Marlon Brando!". Like Schneider, Brando confirmed that the sex was simulated. Bertolucci said about Brando that he was "a monster as an actor and a darling as a human being". Brando refused to speak to Bertolucci for 15 years after the production was completed. Bertolucci said:

However;

The film also features Paul's angry, emotionally charged final confrontation with the corpse of his dead wife. The controversial movie was a hit however, and Brando made the list of Top Ten Box Office Stars for the last time. His gross participation deal earned him $3 million. The voting membership of the Academy of Motion Picture Arts & Sciences again nominated Brando for Best Actor, his seventh nomination. Although Brando won the 1973 New York Film Critics Circle Awards, he did not attend the ceremony or send a representative to pick up the award if he won.

Pauline Kael, in The New Yorker review, wrote "The movie breakthrough has finally come. Bertolucci and Brando have altered the face of an art form." Brando confessed in his autobiography, "To this day I can't say what Last Tango in Paris was about", and added the film "required me to do a lot of emotional arm wrestling with myself, and when it was finished, I decided that I wasn't ever again going to destroy myself emotionally to make a movie".

In 1973, Brando was devastated by the death of his childhood best friend Wally Cox. Brando slept in Cox's pajamas and wrenched his ashes from his widow. She was going to sue for their return, but finally said "I think Marlon needs the ashes more than I do."

Late 1970s
In 1976, Brando appeared in The Missouri Breaks with his friend Jack Nicholson. The movie also reunited the actor with director Arthur Penn. As biographer Stefan Kanfer describes, Penn had difficulty controlling Brando, who seemed intent on going over the top with his border-ruffian-turned-contract-killer Robert E. Lee Clayton: "Marlon made him a cross-dressing psychopath. Absent for the first hour of the movie, Clayton enters on horseback, dangling upside down, caparisoned in white buckskin, Littlefeather-style. He speaks in an Irish accent for no apparent reason. Over the next hour, also for no apparent reason, Clayton assumes the intonation of a British upper-class twit and an elderly frontier woman, complete with a granny dress and matching bonnet. Penn, who believed in letting actors do their thing, indulged Marlon all the way." Critics were unkind, with The Observer calling Brando's performance "one of the most extravagant displays of grandedamerie since Sarah Bernhardt", while The Sun complained, "Marlon Brando at fifty-two has the sloppy belly of a sixty-two-year-old, the white hair of a seventy-two-year-old, and the lack of discipline of a precocious twelve-year-old." However, Kanfer noted: "Even though his late work was met with disapproval, a re-examination shows that often, in the middle of the most pedestrian scene, there would be a sudden, luminous occurrence, a flash of the old Marlon that showed how capable he remained."

In 1978, Brando narrated the English version of Raoni, a French-Belgian documentary film directed by Jean-Pierre Dutilleux and Luiz Carlos Saldanha that focused on the life of Raoni Metuktire and issues surrounding the survival of the Indigenous tribes in north central Brazil. Brando portrayed Superman's father Jor-El in the 1978 film Superman. He agreed to the role only on assurance that he would be paid a large sum for what amounted to a small part, that he would not have to read the script beforehand, and that his lines would be displayed somewhere off-camera. It was revealed in a documentary contained in the 2001 DVD release of Superman that he was paid $3.7 million for two weeks of work. Brando also filmed scenes for the movie's sequel, Superman II, but after producers refused to pay him the same percentage he received for the first movie, he denied them permission to use the footage. "I asked for my usual percentage," he recollected in his memoir, "but they refused, and so did I." However, after Brando's death, the footage was reincorporated into the 2006 recut of the film, Superman II: The Richard Donner Cut and in the 2006 "loose sequel" Superman Returns, in which both used and unused archive footage of him as Jor-El from the first two Superman films was remastered for a scene in the Fortress of Solitude, and Brando's voice-overs were used throughout the film. In 1979, he made a rare television appearance in the miniseries Roots: The Next Generations, portraying George Lincoln Rockwell; he won a Primetime Emmy Award for Outstanding Supporting Actor in a Miniseries or a Movie for his performance.

Brando starred as Colonel Walter E. Kurtz in Francis Ford Coppola's Vietnam epic Apocalypse Now (1979). He plays a highly decorated U.S. Army Special Forces officer who goes renegade, running his own operation based in Cambodia and is feared by the U.S. military as much as the Vietnamese. Brando was paid $1 million a week for 3 weeks work. The film drew attention for its lengthy and troubled production, as Eleanor Coppola's documentary Hearts of Darkness: A Filmmaker's Apocalypse documents: Brando showed up on the set overweight, Martin Sheen suffered a heart attack, and severe weather destroyed several expensive sets. The film's release was also postponed several times while Coppola edited millions of feet of footage. In the documentary, Coppola talks about how astonished he was when an overweight Brando turned up for his scenes and, feeling desperate, decided to portray Kurtz, who appears emaciated in the original story, as a man who had indulged every aspect of himself. Coppola: "He was already heavy when I hired him and he promised me that he was going to get in shape and I imagined that I would, if he were heavy, I could use that. But he was so fat, he was very, very shy about it ... He was very, very adamant about how he didn't want to portray himself that way." Brando admitted to Coppola that he had not read the book, Heart of Darkness, as the director had asked him to, and the pair spent days exploring the story and the character of Kurtz, much to the actor's financial benefit, according to producer Fred Roos: "The clock was ticking on this deal he had and we had to finish him within three weeks or we'd go into this very expensive overage ... And Francis and Marlon would be talking about the character and whole days would go by. And this is at Marlon's urging—and yet he's getting paid for it."

Upon release, Apocalypse Now earned critical acclaim, as did Brando's performance. His whispering of Kurtz's final words "The horror! The horror!", has become particularly famous. Roger Ebert, writing in the Chicago Sun-Times, defended the movie's controversial denouement, opining that the ending, "with Brando's fuzzy, brooding monologues and the final violence, feels much more satisfactory than any conventional ending possibly could." Brando received a fee of $2 million plus 10% of the gross theatrical rental and 10% of the TV sale rights, earning him around $9 million.

Later work
After appearing as oil tycoon Adam Steiffel in 1980's The Formula, which was poorly received critically, Brando announced his retirement from acting. However, he returned in 1989 in A Dry White Season, based on André Brink's 1979 anti-apartheid novel. Brando agreed to do the film for free, but fell out with director Euzhan Palcy over how the film was edited; he even made a rare television appearance in an interview with Connie Chung to voice his disapproval. In his memoir, he maintained that Palcy "had cut the picture so poorly, I thought, that the inherent drama of this conflict was vague at best." Brando received praise for his performance, earning an Academy Award nomination for Best Supporting Actor and winning the Best Actor Award at the Tokyo Film Festival.

Brando scored enthusiastic reviews for his caricature of his Vito Corleone role as Carmine Sabatini in 1990's The Freshman. In his original review, Roger Ebert wrote, "There have been a lot of movies where stars have repeated the triumphs of their parts—but has any star ever done it more triumphantly than Marlon Brando does in The Freshman?" Variety also praised Brando's performance as Sabatini and noted, "Marlon Brando's sublime comedy performance elevates The Freshman from screwball comedy to a quirky niche in film history." Brando starred alongside his friend Johnny Depp on the box office hit Don Juan DeMarco (1995), in which he also shared credits with singer Selena in her only filming appearance, and in Depp's controversial The Brave (1997), which was never released in the United States.

Later performances, such as his appearance in Christopher Columbus: The Discovery (1992) (for which he was nominated for a Raspberry as "Worst Supporting Actor"), The Island of Dr. Moreau (in which he won a "Worst Supporting Actor" Raspberry) (1996), and his barely recognizable appearance in Free Money (1998), resulted in some of the worst reviews of his career. The Island of Dr. Moreau screenwriter Ron Hutchinson would later say in his memoir, Clinging to the Iceberg: Writing for a Living on the Stage and in Hollywood (2017), that Brando sabotaged the film's production by feuding and refusing to cooperate with his colleagues and the film crew.

Unlike its immediate predecessors, Brando's last completed film, The Score (2001), was received generally positively. In the film, in which he portrays a fence, he starred with Robert De Niro.

After Brando's death, the novel Fan-Tan was released. Brando conceived the novel with director Donald Cammell in 1979, but it was not released until 2005.

Final years and death
Brando's notoriety, his troubled family life and his obesity attracted more attention than his late acting career. He had a history of weight fluctuation throughout his career that, by and large, he attributed to his years of stress-related overeating followed by compensatory dieting. He also earned a reputation for being difficult on the set, often unwilling or unable to memorize his lines and less interested in taking direction than in confronting the film director with odd demands. He also dabbled with some innovation in his last years. He had several patents issued in his name from the U.S. Patent and Trademark Office, all of which involve a method of tensioning drumheads, between June 2002 and November 2004 (for example, see ). His assistant, Alice Marchak, resigned from her role due to his eccentric and unpredictable behavior.

In 2004, Brando recorded voice tracks for the character Mrs. Sour in the unreleased animated film Big Bug Man. This was his last role and his only role as a female character.

A longtime close friend of entertainer Michael Jackson, Brando paid regular visits to his Neverland Ranch, resting there for weeks at a time. Brando also participated in the singer's two-day solo career 30th-anniversary celebration concerts in 2001 and starred in his 13-minute-long music video "You Rock My World", in the same year.

The actor's son, Miko, was Jackson's bodyguard and assistant for several years and was a friend of the singer. "The last time my father left his house to go anywhere, to spend any kind of time, it was with Michael Jackson", Miko stated. "He loved it ... He had a 24-hour chef, 24-hour security, 24-hour help, 24-hour kitchen, 24-hour maid service. Just carte blanche." "Michael was instrumental helping my father through the last few years of his life. For that I will always be indebted to him. Dad had a hard time breathing in his final days and he was on oxygen much of the time. He loved the outdoors, so Michael would invite him over to Neverland. Dad could name all the trees there and the flowers, but being on oxygen it was hard for him to get around and see them all, it's such a big place. So Michael got Dad a golf cart with a portable oxygen tank so he could go around and enjoy Neverland. They'd just drive around—Michael Jackson, Marlon Brando, with an oxygen tank in a golf cart." In April 2001, Brando was hospitalized with pneumonia.

In 2004, Brando signed with Tunisian film director Ridha Behi and began preproduction on a project to be titled Brando and Brando. Up to a week before his death, he was working on the script in anticipation of a July/August 2004 start date. Production was suspended in July 2004 following Brando's death, at which time Behi stated that he would continue the film as an homage to Brando, with a new title of Citizen Brando.

On July 1, 2004, Brando died of respiratory failure from pulmonary fibrosis with congestive heart failure at the UCLA Medical Center. The cause of death was initially withheld, with his lawyer citing privacy concerns. He also suffered from diabetes and liver cancer. Shortly before his death and despite needing an oxygen mask to breathe, he recorded his voice to appear in The Godfather: The Game, once again as Don Vito Corleone. However, Brando recorded only one line due to his health and an impersonator was hired to finish his lines. His single recorded line was included within the final game as a tribute to the actor. Some additional lines from his character were directly lifted from the film. Karl Malden—Brando's co-star in three films (A Streetcar Named Desire, On the Waterfront, and One-Eyed Jacks)—spoke in a documentary accompanying the DVD of A Streetcar Named Desire about a phone call he received from Brando shortly before Brando's death. A distressed Brando told Malden he kept falling over. Malden wanted to come over, but Brando put him off, telling him there was no point. Three weeks later, Brando was dead. Shortly before his death, he had apparently refused permission for tubes carrying oxygen to be inserted into his lungs, which, he was told, was the only way to prolong his life.

Brando was cremated and his ashes were put in with those of his good friend Wally Cox. They were then scattered partly in Tahiti and partly in Death Valley. In 2007, a 165-minute biopic of Brando for Turner Classic Movies, Brando: The Documentary, produced by Mike Medavoy (the executor of Brando's will), was released.

Personal life
Brando was known for his tumultuous personal life and his large number of partners and children. He was the father to at least 11 children, three of whom were adopted. In 1976, he told a French journalist, "Homosexuality is so much in fashion, it no longer makes news. Like a large number of men, I, too, have had homosexual experiences, and I am not ashamed. I have never paid much attention to what people think about me. But if there is someone who is convinced that Jack Nicholson and I are lovers, may they continue to do so. I find it amusing."

In Songs My Mother Taught Me, Brando wrote that he met Marilyn Monroe at a party where she played piano, unnoticed by anybody else there, that they had an affair and maintained an intermittent relationship for many years, and that he received a telephone call from her several days before she died. He also claimed numerous other romances, although he did not discuss his marriages, his wives, or his children in his autobiography.

He met nisei actress and dancer Reiko Sato in the early 1950s. Though their relationship cooled, they remained friends for the rest of Sato's life, with her dividing her time between Los Angeles and Tetiaroa in her later years. In 1954 Dorothy Kilgallen reported they were an item. Brando also dated actress Ariane "Pat" Quinn.

Brando was smitten with the Mexican actress Katy Jurado after seeing her in High Noon. They met when Brando was filming Viva Zapata! in Mexico. Brando told Joseph L. Mankiewicz that he was attracted to "her enigmatic eyes, black as hell, pointing at you like fiery arrows". Their first date became the beginning of an extended affair that lasted many years and peaked at the time they worked together on One-Eyed Jacks (1960), a film directed by Brando.

Brando met actress Rita Moreno in 1954, and they began a love affair. Moreno later revealed in her memoir that when she became pregnant by Brando he arranged for an abortion. After the abortion was botched and Brando fell in love with Tarita Teriipaia, Moreno attempted suicide by overdosing on Brando's sleeping pills. Years after they broke up, Moreno played his love interest in the film The Night of the Following Day.

Brando was briefly engaged to the 19 year-old French actress Josanne Mariani whom he met in 1954. They broke their engagement when Brando discovered that his other girlfriend, Anna Kashfi, was pregnant and went on to marry her instead.

Brando married actress Anna Kashfi in 1957. Kashfi was born in Calcutta and moved to Wales from India in 1947. She is the daughter of a Welsh steel worker of Irish descent, William O'Callaghan, who had been superintendent on the Indian State railways, and his Welsh wife Phoebe. However, in her book, Brando for Breakfast, Kashfi claimed that she was half Indian and that O'Callaghan was her stepfather. She claimed that her biological father was Indian and that she was the result of an "unregistered alliance" between her parents. Brando and Kashfi had a son, Christian Brando, on May 11, 1958; they divorced in 1959.

In 1960, Brando married Movita Castaneda, a Mexican-American actress; the marriage was annulled in 1968 after it was discovered her previous marriage was still active. Castaneda had appeared in the first Mutiny on the Bounty film in 1935, some 27 years before the 1962 remake with Brando as Fletcher Christian. They had two children together: Miko Castaneda Brando (born 1961) and Rebecca Brando (born 1966).

French actress Tarita Teriipaia, who played Brando's love interest in Mutiny on the Bounty, became his third wife on August 10, 1962. She was 20 years old, 18 years younger than Brando, who was reportedly delighted by her naïveté. Because Teriipaia was a native French speaker, Brando became fluent in the language and gave numerous interviews in French. Brando and Teriipaia had two children together: Simon Teihotu Brando (born 1963) and Tarita Cheyenne Brando (1970–1995). Brando also adopted Teriipaia's daughter, Maimiti Brando (born 1977) and niece, Raiatua Brando (born 1982). Brando and Teriipaia divorced in July 1972.

After Brando's death, the daughter of actress Cynthia Lynn claimed that Brando had had a short-lived affair with her mother, who appeared with Brando in Bedtime Story, and that this affair resulted in her birth in 1964. Throughout the late 1960s and into the early 1980s, he had a tempestuous, long-term relationship with actress Jill Banner.

Brando had a long-term relationship with his housekeeper Maria Cristina Ruiz, with whom he had three children: Ninna Priscilla Brando (born May 13, 1989), Myles Jonathan Brando (born January 16, 1992), and Timothy Gahan Brando (born January 6, 1994). Brando also adopted Petra Brando-Corval (born 1972), the daughter of his assistant Caroline Barrett and novelist James Clavell.

Brando's close friendship with Wally Cox was the subject of rumors. Brando told a journalist: "If Wally had been a woman, I would have married him and we would have lived happily ever after." Two of Cox's wives, however, dismissed the suggestion that the love was more than platonic.

Brando's grandson Tuki Brando (born 1990), son of Cheyenne Brando, is a fashion model. His numerous grandchildren also include Prudence Brando and Shane Brando, children of Miko C. Brando; the children of Rebecca Brando; and the three children of Teihotu Brando among others.

Stephen Blackehart has been reported to be the son of Brando, but Blackehart disputes this claim.

In 2018, Quincy Jones and Jennifer Lee claimed that Brando had had a sexual relationship with comedian and Superman III actor Richard Pryor. Pryor's daughter Rain Pryor later disputed the claim.

Lifestyle
Brando earned a reputation as a "bad boy" for his public outbursts and antics. According to Los Angeles magazine, "Brando was rock and roll before anybody knew what rock and roll was." His behavior during the filming of Mutiny on the Bounty (1962) seemed to bolster his reputation as a difficult star. He was blamed for a change in director and a runaway budget, though he disclaimed responsibility for both. On June 12, 1973, Brando broke paparazzo Ron Galella's jaw. Galella had followed Brando, who was accompanied by talk show host Dick Cavett, after a taping of The Dick Cavett Show in New York City. He paid a $40,000 out-of-court settlement and suffered an infected hand as a result. Galella wore a football helmet the next time he photographed Brando at a gala benefiting the American Indians Development Association in 1974.

The filming of Mutiny on the Bounty affected Brando's life in a profound way, as he fell in love with Tahiti and its people. He bought a 12-island atoll, Tetiaroa, and in 1970 hired an award-winning young Los Angeles architect, Bernard Judge, to build his home and natural village there without despoiling the environment. An environmental laboratory protecting sea birds and turtles was established, and for many years student groups visited. The 1983 hurricane destroyed many of the structures, including his resort. A hotel using Brando's name, The Brando Resort opened in 2014. Brando was an active ham radio operator, with the call signs KE6PZH and FO5GJ (the latter from his island). He was listed in the Federal Communications Commission (FCC) records as Martin Brandeaux to preserve his privacy.

In the A&E Biography episode on Brando, biographer Peter Manso comments, "On the one hand, being a celebrity allowed Marlon to take his revenge on the world that had so deeply hurt him, so deeply scarred him. On the other hand he hated it because he knew it was false and ephemeral." In the same program another biographer, David Thomson, says, Many, many people who worked with him, and came to work with him with the best intentions, went away in despair saying he's a spoiled kid. It has to be done his way or he goes away with some vast story about how he was wronged, he was offended, and I think that fits with the psychological pattern that he was a wronged kid.

Political activism
In 1946, Brando performed in Ben Hecht's Zionist play A Flag is Born. He attended some fundraisers for John F. Kennedy in the 1960 presidential election. In August 1963, he participated in the March on Washington along with fellow celebrities Harry Belafonte, James Garner, Charlton Heston, Burt Lancaster and Sidney Poitier. Along with Paul Newman, Brando also participated in the Freedom Rides. Brando supported Lyndon B. Johnson in the 1964 United States presidential election.

In autumn of 1967, Brando visited Helsinki, Finland at a charity party organized by UNICEF at the Helsinki City Theatre. The gala was televised in thirteen countries. Brando's visit was based on the famine he had seen in Bihar, India, and he presented the film he shot there to the press and invited guests. He spoke in favor of children's rights and development aid in developing countries.

In the aftermath of the 1968 assassination of Martin Luther King Jr., Brando made one of the strongest commitments to furthering King's work. Shortly after King's death, he announced that he was bowing out of the lead role of a major film (The Arrangement) (1969) which was about to begin production in order to devote himself to the civil rights movement. "I felt I'd better go find out where it is; what it is to be black in this country; what this rage is all about," Brando said on the late-night ABC-TV talk show Joey Bishop Show. In A&E's Biography episode on Brando, actor and co-star Martin Sheen states, "I'll never forget the night that Reverend King was shot and I turned on the news and Marlon was walking through Harlem with Mayor Lindsay. And there were snipers and there was a lot of unrest and he kept walking and talking through those neighborhoods with Mayor Lindsay. It was one of the most incredible acts of courage I ever saw, and it meant a lot and did a lot."

Brando's participation in the civil rights movement actually began well before King's death. In the early 1960s, he contributed thousands of dollars to both the Southern Christian Leadership Conference (S.C.L.C.) and to a scholarship fund established for the children of slain Mississippi N.A.A.C.P. leader Medgar Evers. In 1964 Brando was arrested at a "fish-in" held to protest a broken treaty that had promised Native Americans fishing rights in Puget Sound. By this time, Brando was already involved in films that carried messages about human rights: Sayonara, which addressed interracial romance, and The Ugly American, depicting the conduct of U.S. officials abroad and the deleterious effect on the citizens of foreign countries. For a time, he was also donating money to the Black Panther Party and considered himself a friend of founder Bobby Seale. He also gave a eulogy after Bobby Hutton was shot by the police. Brando ended his financial support for the group over his perception of its increasing radicalization, specifically a passage in a Panther pamphlet put out by Eldridge Cleaver advocating indiscriminate violence, "for the Revolution."

Brando was also a supporter of Native American rights and the American Indian Movement. The March 1964 fish-in protest near Tacoma, Washington where he was arrested while protesting for fishing treaty rights won him respect from members of the Puyallup tribe, who reportedly dubbed the spot where he was arrested "Brando's Landing." At the 1973 Academy Awards ceremony, Brando refused to accept the Oscar for his career-reviving performance in The Godfather. Sacheen Littlefeather represented him at the ceremony. She appeared in full Apache attire and stated that owing to the "poor treatment of Native Americans in the film industry", Brando would not accept the award. This occurred while the standoff at Wounded Knee was ongoing. The event grabbed the attention of the US and the world media. This was considered a major event and victory for the movement by its supporters and participants.

Outside of his film work, Brando appeared before the California Assembly in support of a fair housing law and personally joined picket lines in demonstrations protesting discrimination in housing developments in 1963.

He was also an activist against apartheid. In 1964, he favored a boycott of his films in South Africa to prevent them from being shown to a segregated audience. He took part at a 1975 protest rally against American investments in South Africa and for the release of Nelson Mandela. In 1989, Brando also starred in the film A Dry White Season, based upon André Brink's novel of the same name.

Comments on Jews and Hollywood
In an interview in Playboy magazine in January 1979, Brando said: "You've seen every single race besmirched, but you never saw an image of the kike because the Jews were ever so watchful for that—and rightly so. They never allowed it to be shown on screen. The Jews have done so much for the world that, I suppose, you get extra disappointed because they didn't pay attention to that."

Brando made a similar comment on Larry King Live in April 1996, saying: 

Larry King, who was Jewish, replied: "When you say—when you say something like that, you are playing right in, though, to anti-Semitic people who say the Jews are—" Brando interrupted: "No, no, because I will be the first one who will appraise the Jews honestly and say 'Thank God for the Jews'."

Jay Kanter, Brando's agent, producer, and friend, defended him in Daily Variety: "Marlon has spoken to me for hours about his fondness for the Jewish people, and he is a well-known supporter of Israel;" Kanter himself was Jewish. Similarly, Louie Kemp, in his article for Jewish Journal, wrote: "You might remember him as Don Vito Corleone, Stanley Kowalski or the eerie Col. Walter E. Kurtz in 'Apocalypse Now', but I remember Marlon Brando as a mensch and a personal friend of the Jewish people when they needed it most."

Legacy

Brando was one of the most respected actors of the post-war era. He is listed by the American Film Institute as the fourth greatest male star whose screen debut occurred before or during 1950 (it occurred in 1950). He earned respect among critics for his memorable performances and charismatic screen presence. He helped popularize 'method acting'. He is regarded as one of the greatest cinema actors of the 20th century.<ref>Movies in American History: An Encyclopedia'</ref>Encyclopædia Britannica describes him as "the most celebrated of the method actors, and his slurred, mumbling delivery marked his rejection of classical dramatic training. His true and passionate performances proved him one of the greatest actors of his generation." It also notes the apparent paradox of his talent: "He is regarded as the most influential actor of his generation, yet his open disdain for the acting profession ... often manifested itself in the form of questionable choices and uninspired performances. Nevertheless, he remains a riveting screen presence with a vast emotional range and an endless array of compulsively watchable idiosyncrasies."

Cultural influence

Marlon Brando is a cultural icon with enduring popularity. His rise to national attention in the 1950s had a profound effect on American culture. According to film critic Pauline Kael, "Brando represented a reaction against the post-war mania for security. As a protagonist, the Brando of the early fifties had no code, only his instincts. He was a development from the gangster leader and the outlaw. He was antisocial because he knew society was crap; he was a hero to youth because he was strong enough not to take the crap ... Brando represented a contemporary version of the free American ... Brando is still the most exciting American actor on the screen." 

Sociologist Dr. Suzanne McDonald-Walker states: "Marlon Brando, sporting leather jacket, jeans, and moody glare, became a cultural icon summing up 'the road' in all its maverick glory." His portrayal of the gang leader Johnny Strabler in The Wild One has become an enduring image, used both as a symbol of rebelliousness and a fashion accessory that includes a Perfecto style motorcycle jacket, a tilted cap, jeans and sunglasses. Johnny's haircut inspired a craze for sideburns, followed by James Dean and Elvis Presley, among others. Dean copied Brando's acting style extensively and Presley used Brando's image as a model for his role in Jailhouse Rock. The "I coulda been a contender" scene from On the Waterfront, according to the author of Brooklyn Boomer, Martin H. Levinson, is "one of the most famous scenes in motion picture history, and the line itself has become part of America's cultural lexicon." An example of the endurance of Brando's popular "Wild One" image was the 2009 release of replicas of the leather jacket worn by Brando's Johnny Strabler character. The jackets were marketed by Triumph, the manufacturer of the Triumph Thunderbird motorcycles featured in The Wild One, and were officially licensed by Brando's estate.

Brando was also considered a male sex symbol. Linda Williams writes: "Marlon Brando [was] the quintessential American male sex symbol of the late fifties and early sixties". Brando was an early lesbian icon who, along with James Dean, influenced the butch look and self-image in the 1950s and after.

Brando has also been immortalized in music; most notably, he was mentioned in the lyrics of "It's Hard to Be a Saint in the City" by Bruce Springsteen, in which one of the opening lines read "I could walk like Brando right in to the sun", and in Neil Young's "Pocahontas" as a tribute to his lifetime support of Native Americans and in which he is depicted sitting by a fire with Neil and Pocahontas. He was also mentioned in "Vogue" by Madonna, "Is This What You Wanted" by Leonard Cohen on the album New Skin for the Old Ceremony, "Eyeless" by Slipknot on their self-titled album, and most recently in the song simply titled "Marlon Brando" off the Australian singer Alex Cameron's 2017 album Forced Witness. Bob Dylan's 2020 song "My Own Version of You" references one of his most famous performances in the line, "I'll take the Scarface Pacino and the Godfather Brando / Mix 'em up in a tank and get a robot commando".

He is also one of the many faces on the cover of The Beatles' album "Sgt Pepper's Lonely Hearts Club Band", directly above the wax model of Ringo Starr.

Brando's films, along with those of James Dean, caused Honda to come forward with its "You Meet the Nicest People on a Honda" ads, in order to curb the negative association motorcycles had gotten with rebels and outlaws.

Views on acting

In his autobiography Songs My Mother Taught Me, Brando observed:

He also confessed that, while having great admiration for the theater, he did not return to it after his initial success primarily because the work left him drained emotionally:

Brando repeatedly credited Stella Adler and her understanding of the Stanislavski acting technique for bringing realism to American cinema, but also added:

In the 2015 documentary Listen to Me Marlon, Brando shared his thoughts on playing a death scene, stating, "That's a tough scene to play. You have to make 'em believe that you are dying ... Try to think of the most intimate moment you've ever had in your life." His favorite actors were Spencer Tracy, John Barrymore, Fredric March, James Cagney and Paul Muni. He also showed admiration for Sean Penn, Jack Nicholson, Johnny Depp and Daniel Day-Lewis.

Financial legacy
On his death in 2004, Brando left an estate valued at $21.6 million. According to Forbes, his estate still earned about $9 million in 2005, and that year the magazine named him as one of the top-earning deceased celebrities in the world.

In December 2019, the Rolex GMT Master Ref. 1675 worn by Brando in Francis Ford Coppola's Vietnam War epic Apocalypse Now was announced to be sold at an auction for $1.61 million, translating to $1.952 million with fees.

Filmography

Awards and honors

Brando was named the fourth greatest male star whose screen debut occurred before or during 1950 by the American Film Institute, and part of TIME magazine's Time 100: The Most Important People of the Century. He was also named one of the top 10 "Icons of the Century" by Variety magazine."100 Icons of the Century: Marlon Brando"  Variety. Retrieved August 19, 2011.

See also

List of oldest and youngest Academy Award winners and nominees
 List of actors with Academy Award nominations
List of actors with two or more Academy Award nominations in acting categories
 List of actors with two or more Academy Awards in acting categories
 List of LGBT Academy Award winners and nominees

References
Notes

Citations

Bibliography

 
 Bain, David Haward. The Old Iron Road: An Epic of Rails, Roads, and the Urge to Go West. New York: Penguin Books, 2004. .
 
 
 
 Brando, Marlon and Donald Cammell. Fan-Tan. New York: Knopf, 2005. .
 
 
 
 Englund, George. The Way It's Never Been Done Before: My Friendship With Marlon Brando. New York: Harper Collins Publishers, 2004. .
 
 
 
 
 Grobel, Lawrence. "Conversations with Brando." New York, Hyperion, 1990. Cooper Square Press 1999. Rat Press, 2009
 
 Judge, Bernard. Waltzing With Brando: Planning a Paradise in Tahiti. New York: ORO Editions, 2011.
 
 
 
 
 
 McDonough, Jimmy. Big Bosoms and Square Jaws: The Biography of Russ Meyer, King of the Sex Film. New York: Crown, 2005. .
 
 Pendergast, Tom and Sara. St. James Encyclopedia of Popular Culture, Volume 1. Detroit, Michigan: St. James Press, 2000. .
 Petkovich, Anthony. "Burn, Brando, Burn!". UK: Headpress 19: World Without End (1999), pp. 91–112.
 
 
 
 Schoell, William. The Sundance Kid: A Biography of Robert Redford.'' Boulder, CO: Taylor Trade Publishing, 2006. .

External links

 
 
 
 
 Vanity Fair: "The King Who Would Be Man" by Budd Schulberg
 The New Yorker: "The Duke in His Domain" – Truman Capote's influential 1957 interview.
 Excess after success: Marlon Brando

 
1924 births
2004 deaths
20th-century American male actors
21st-century American male actors
Amateur radio people
American male film actors
American male stage actors
American male television actors
American people of Irish descent
Best Actor Academy Award winners
Best Drama Actor Golden Globe (film) winners
Best Foreign Actor BAFTA Award winners
Cannes Film Festival Award for Best Actor winners
David di Donatello winners
Respiratory disease deaths in California
Deaths from pulmonary fibrosis
Deaths from respiratory failure
Deaths from congestive heart failure
People with diabetes
Donaldson Award winners
Film directors from Illinois
Former Christian Scientists
Bisexual male actors
LGBT people from Illinois
LGBT people from Nebraska
Male actors from Evanston, Illinois
Male actors from Omaha, Nebraska
Method actors
Native Americans' rights activists
Outstanding Performance by a Supporting Actor in a Miniseries or Movie Primetime Emmy Award winners
People from Libertyville, Illinois
People from Sayville, New York
Stella Adler Studio of Acting alumni
Brando family
American people of German descent
American people of Dutch descent
American people of English descent
American bisexual actors